Mirko Manuele Martorana (born 19 April 1994), known professionally as Rkomi, is an Italian rapper and songwriter.

Early life 
Rkomi was born and raised in Milan in the famous district of Calvairate, located in the eastern part of the suburbs of Milan. He attended the CFP Galdus hotel Institute until the third year, and then dropped out at the age of 17 without obtaining a diploma. Until the age of 21 he worked as a bartender, bricklayer and dishwasher.

He became friends with rapper Tedua, who was his roommate. Tedua himself originally planned to become a tour manager.

Career

Calvairate Mixtape and Dasein Sollen 
Rkomi has stated several times that he was initiated into a musical career due to his best friend Tedua.

Rkomi's first musical projects were Keep Calm Mixtape (with Sfazo) and Quello che non fai tu (with Falco) in 2012, Cugini Bella Vita EP (with Pablo Asso) in 2013, followed by the more famous amateur songbook Calvairate Mixtape, which was created by six people (including Tedua and Izi), in 2014.

That was followed by almost two years of silence, then Rkomi published the song Dasein Sollen on the YouTube platform. The song's title is a direct reference to the Heideggerian concept of Dasein. The rapper learned about it through a random search on the Internet. On October 13, 2016, Rkomi released an EP Dasein Sollen in collaboration with the Digital Distribution label.

First collaborations and Io in terra 
Following the good reception of Dasein Sollen (the single Aeroplanini di carta, created in collaboration with Izi, was certified platinum), Rkomi was hired by an indie singer-songwriter Calcutta for the opening of the show live in Turin.

Having come into contact with Shablo, former producer of the album Aeroplanini di carta, Rkomi decides to sign a contract with the Rock Music label managed by Shablo himself and Marracash. On March 13, 2017, the rapper announced that he was going to release his first studio album Universal.

On September 8, 2017, Rkomi released the album Io in terra, consisting of 14 tracks, some of them created in collaboration with Marracash (in Milano Bachata), Noyz Narcos (in Verme) and Alberto Paone (in Mai più), a drummer. The album was preceded by the singles Solo, Apnea and Mai più. After its debut in the music charts, Io in terra reached the top of the FIMI chart and was certified gold, while Milano Bachata, Apnea and Mai più were certified platinum.

Ossigeno - EP and Dove gli occhi non arrivano 
On June 26, 2018, Rkomi announced the upcoming release of an EP, entitled Ossigeno - EP, which was released on July 13, 2019, accompanied by a vinyl edition and an autobiographical book. The CD features the single Acqua calda e limone, which was written in collaboration with rapper Ernia, as well as songs written in collaboration with Tedua, Night Skinny and Mc Bin Laden. At the end of 2018, the single Non ho mai tanto la mia età was released on the occasion of the release of the video game Assassin's Creed: Origins. It is a tribute to a video game saga created by Ubisoft. Solletico and Acqua calda e limone were certified gold.

On February 19, 2019, Rkomi revealed that he intended to release the album Dove gli occhi non arrivano, which was released on March 22, 2020. Jovanotti, Elisa, Carl Brave, Sfera Ebbasta, Dardust and Ghali also worked on the disc. The album successfully debuted at the top of the FIMI rating, as did Io in terra.

Taxi Driver and the Sanremo Festival 
On April 1, 2021, Rkomi set the release date for the third studio album, titled Taxi Driver, which was released on April 30. The first single Ho spento il cielo, created in collaboration with Tommaso Paradiso, was released on April 14. Like previous albums, Taxi Driver debuted directly at the top of the FIMI Album Chart. In the same week the single Nuovo range, a collaboration with Sfera Ebbasta, reached the top of the Top Singles. all the songs contained within the disc were classified within the first hundred positions in the Top Singles. On September 24, 2021, the live album Taxi Driver (MTV Unplugged) was released. It included previous tracks edited and sung live.

In December 2021, Rkomi released a joint single with Elodie entitled La coda del diavolo.

On December 4, 2021, Rkomi's participation in the Sanremo Music Festival 2022 was announced at TG1, followed by the announcement of the song Insuperabile on December 15. The song took 17th place in the final ranking.

In February 2022 he collaborates with  Elisa on the song Quello che manca.

Style and influences 
Although the rapper's first songs belong to pure rap and do not include other genres, Rkomi proposed himself as an exponent of indie rap. The album Io in terra has often been considered as an example of hip-hop influenced by the genres of prog, funk and others, because of the original and innovative bases (in addition to the drums, the electric bass, guitar and trumpet appear). With Ossigeno - EP, Rkomi began to approach a more funk and pop version of rap, establishing a new musical dimension with the album Dove gli occhi non arrivano, characterized by purely pop sharing.

Rkomi's work was influenced by such indie artistes as Saint PHNX, Gorillaz and Twenty One Pilots. As for hip-hop, the rapper's work was influenced by Italian artists Noyz Narcos, Marracash, Fabri Fibra, Gué Pequeno, and such foreign artistes as German rapper Cro, French rapper Lomepal and American rappers Tyler, the Creator, Chance the Rapper and Kendrick Lamar.

Discography

Studio albums 

 Io in terra (2017)
 Dove gli occhi non arrivano (2019)
 Taxi Driver (2021)

Live albums 
 Taxi Driver (MTV Unplugged) (2021)

EPs 

 Dasein Sollen (2016)
 Ossigeno (2018)

Mixtapes 

 Calvairate Mixtape (2014)

Singles 

 "Dasein Sollen" (2016)
 "Sul Serio" (2016)
 "Sissignore" (2016)
 "180" (2016)
 "Aeroplanini di carta" (in collaboration with Izi) (2016)
 "Oh Mama" (2016)
 "Rossetto" (2017)
 "Solo" (2017)
 "Apnea" (2017)
 "Mai Piú" (2017)
 "Acqua calda e limone" (in collaboration with Ernia) (2018)
 "Non ho mai avuto la mia età" (2018)
 "Visti dall'alto" (in collaboration with Dardust) (2019)
 "La coda del diavolo" (in collaboration with Elodie) (2021)
 "Insuperabile" (2022)
 "Ossa rotte" (2022)

Music videos 

 "Dasein sollen" (2016)
 "Sul serio" (2016)
 "Sissignore" (2016)
 "180" (2016)
 "Aeroplanini di carta" (2016)
 "Oh Mama" (2016)
 "Fuck Tomorrow" (2016)
 "Rossetto (intro)" (2017)
 "Bimbi" (2017)
 "Solo" (2017)
 "Apnea" (2017)
 "Mai più" (2017)
 "Milano Bachata" (2017)
 "Acqua calda e limone" (2018)
 "Non ho mai avuto l'età" (2018)
 "Visti dall'alto" (2019)
 "Vento sulla luna" (2019)
 "Ho spento il cielo" (2021)
 "Fottuta canzone" (2021)
 "Insuperabile" (2022)
 "Ossa rotte" (2022)

Awards and nominations

MTV Europe Music Awards 

 2021 — Nomination Best Italian Act

Sanremo Music Festival 2022 

 2022 — 17th place with the song Insuperabile

References

Italian rappers
Living people
21st-century Italian male singers
1994 births